Odyssey Space Research, LLC is a small business based in Houston, Texas near NASA Lyndon B. Johnson Space Center providing engineering research and analysis services. This start-up in the space industry founded in November 2003 has already won major contracts and is the only private company working on the 5 next human-rated spacecraft (ATV, HTV, CEV, and both COTS spacecraft with SpaceX and Orbital Sciences Corporation).

Projects 
June 9, 2011 Odyssey Space Research, L.L.C., announced a space-based, experimental app, dubbed SpaceLab for iOS, which will be used for space research aboard the International Space Station (ISS). The SpaceLab for iOS app will make its way to the ISS on an iPhone 4 aboard the orbiter Atlantis on the space shuttle fleet's historic final mission, STS-135, and will remain there for several months for the ISS crew to conduct a series of experiments. Odyssey also announced it is bringing the astronauts' on-orbit experimental tasks down to earth for "terrestrial" consumers to enjoy via the SpaceLab for iOS app available today from the App Store.

August 31, 2006 NASA announced the results of the Orion crew exploration vehicle (CEV) development contract competition. Odyssey Space Research is part of the winning Lockheed Martin team supporting NASA's Orion project. The Odyssey role will include support of the vehicle guidance, navigation and control (GN&C), simulation development, and related analysis.

August 18, 2006 NASA announced the results of the Commercial Orbital Transportation Services (COTS) demonstration competition. Odyssey Space Research is part of one of the two COTS winning teams: SpaceX. Odyssey's role will include support of the Dragon vehicle guidance, navigation and control (GN&C) development, selected simulation and test-bed development, related analyses, systems engineering and operations.

References

Aerospace engineering organizations
Aerospace companies of the United States
Companies based in Houston
Companies established in 2003
Private spaceflight companies

it:Skip reentry